Mario Fannin, Jr. (born December 4, 1987) is a former American football running back. He was signed by the Denver Broncos as an undrafted free agent in 2011. He grew up in Lovejoy, Georgia and was a four-star athlete at Lovejoy High School before being recruited to play football at Auburn.

He was released by the Denver Broncos on May 21, 2013.

External links
Just Sports Stats
Denver Broncos bio
ESPN Player Stats

Living people
1987 births
Players of American football from Georgia (U.S. state)
People from Hampton, Georgia
American football running backs
Canadian football running backs
Auburn Tigers football players
Denver Broncos players
Winnipeg Blue Bombers players
Brooklyn Bolts players